Randy Alan Exelby (born August 13, 1965) is a Canadian former professional ice hockey goaltender. He played in two games in the National Hockey League, one for the Montreal Canadiens in 1989 and one for the Edmonton Oilers in 1990. The rest of his career, which lasted from 1987 to 1991 was spent in the minor leagues.

Biography
Exelby was born in Toronto, Ontario. His father, Clare Exelby, is a former Canadian Football League player. His nephew Kyle Capobianco is a defenceman with the Arizona Coyotes.

As a youth, Exelby played in the 1978 Quebec International Pee-Wee Hockey Tournament with the Toronto Shopsy's minor ice hockey team with future NHL goalie Bob Essensa. 

Exelby made his NHL debut on January 27, 1989 against the Buffalo Sabres. He entered the game in the second period when the starting goalie, Patrick Roy, had to go to the washroom. He won the Rob Capellupo Award while playing for the Phoenix Roadrunners.

In 1994, he started a chain of hockey equipment shops in the Phoenix, Arizona area called "Behind the Mask". It currently operates in three full-service retail stores. He had three team shops at all three Polar Ice locations and all three rinks are under new ownership The Peoria and Gilbert locations are now operated by AZ Ice and the Chandler location is now operated by Ice Den of Chandler.

Career statistics

Regular season and playoffs

References

External links
 

1965 births
Living people
Canadian ice hockey goaltenders
Edmonton Oilers players
Ice hockey people from Ontario
Kansas City Blades players
Lake Superior State Lakers men's ice hockey players
Louisville Icehawks players
Montreal Canadiens draft picks
Montreal Canadiens players
National Hockey League supplemental draft picks
Phoenix Roadrunners (IHL) players
Sherbrooke Canadiens players
Canadian football people from Toronto
Springfield Indians players